Compuverde AB is an information technology company with a focus on computer data storage  and cloud computing.

Description
Compuverde was founded by Stefan Bernbo, Christian Melander, and Roger Persson in 2008. It is headquartered in Karlskrona; in the southeastern part of Sweden.
It markets software-defined storage, converged storage, and unified storage platform, using computer clusters of standardized servers to store petabytes of data and billions of files.

The executive chairman of Compuverde is Swedish entrepreneur Mikael Blomqvist, also a board member of Blekinge Institute of Technology.
In 1990, Blomqvist founded the cable insulation producer Roxtec.
Compuverde is a member of the Storage Networking Industry Association trade group.

In January 2012, Compuverde, Blekinge Institute of Technology and Ericsson received recognition from the Development of Knowledge and Competence (KK-stiftelsen) in Sweden for a joint venture project on big data storage and cloud computing.
In 2016 a product called Metro Cluster was announced for data centers.

In April 2019, Compuverde entered into a definitive agreement to be acquired by Pure Storage for an undisclosed amount of money.

References

Computer companies established in 2008
Computer companies disestablished in 2019
Swedish companies disestablished in 2019
Information technology companies of Sweden
Computer storage companies
2019 mergers and acquisitions
Swedish companies established in 2008